A raisin is a dried grape. Raisins are produced in many regions of the world and may be eaten raw or used in cooking, baking, and brewing. In the United Kingdom, Ireland, New Zealand Australia and South Africa, the word raisin is reserved for the dark-colored dried large grape, with sultana being a golden-colored dried grape, and currant being a dried small Black Corinth seedless grape.

Etymology
The word "raisin" dates back to Middle English and is a loanword from Old French; in modern French, raisin means "grape", while a dried grape is a raisin sec, or "dry grape". The Old French word, in turn, developed from the Latin word racemus, "a bunch of grapes".

Varieties

Raisin varieties depend on the type of grape and appear in a variety of sizes and colors including green, black, brown, purple, blue, and yellow. Seedless varieties include the sultana (the common American type is known as Thompson Seedless in the United States), the Zante currants (black Corinthian raisins, Vitis vinifera L. var. Apyrena) and Flame grapes. Raisins are traditionally sun-dried, but may also be artificially dehydrated.

"Golden raisins" are generally dried in dehydrators with controlled temperature and humidity, which allows them to retain a lighter color and more moisture. They are often treated with sulfur dioxide after drying.

Black Corinth or Zante currant are small, sometimes seedless raisins that are much darker and have a tart, tangy flavor. They are usually called currants. Muscat raisins are large compared to other varieties, and also sweeter.

Grapes used to produce raisins in the Middle East and Asia include the large black monukka (or manucca) grapes that produce large raisins.

Processing

Raisins are produced commercially by drying harvested grape berries. For a grape berry to dry, water inside the grape must be removed completely from the interior of the cells onto the surface of the grape where the water droplets can evaporate. However, this diffusion process is very difficult because the grape skin contains wax in its cuticle, which prevents the water from passing through. In addition to this, the physical and chemical mechanisms located on the outer layers of the grape are adapted to prevent water loss. The three steps to commercial raisin production include pre-treatment, drying, and post-drying processes.

Pre-treatment
Pre-treatment is a necessary step in raisin production to ensure the increased rate of water removal during the drying process. A faster water removal rate decreases the rate of browning and helps to produce more desirable raisins. The historical method of completing this process was developed in the Mediterranean and Asia Minor areas by using a dry emulsion cold dip made of potassium carbonate and ethyl esters of fatty acids. This dip was shown to increase the rate of water loss by two- to three-fold.

Recently, new methods have been developed such as exposing the grapes to oil emulsions or dilute alkaline solutions. These methods can encourage water transfer to the outer surface of grapes which helps to increase the efficiency of the drying process.

Drying

The three types of drying methods are: sun drying, shade drying, and mechanical drying. Sun drying is an inexpensive process; however, environmental contamination, insect infections, and microbial deterioration can occur and the resulting raisins are often of low quality. Additionally, sun drying is a very slow process and may not produce the most desirable raisins.

Mechanical drying can be done in a safer and more controlled environment where rapid drying is guaranteed. One type of mechanical drying is to use microwave heating. Water molecules in the grapes absorb microwave energy resulting in rapid evaporation. Microwave heating often produces puffy raisins.

Post-drying processes
After the drying process is complete, raisins are sent to processing plants where they are cleaned with water to remove any foreign objects that may have become embedded during the drying process. Stems and off-grade raisins are also removed. The washing process may cause rehydration, so another drying step is completed after washing to ensure that the added moisture has been removed.

All steps in the production of raisins are very important in determining the quality of raisins. Sometimes, sulfur dioxide is applied to raisins after the pre-treatment step and before drying to decrease the rate of browning caused by the reaction between polyphenol oxidase and phenolic compounds. Sulfur dioxide also helps to preserve flavor and prevent the loss of certain vitamins during the drying process.

Production
According to worldatlas research, these are the top 3 countries with the highest raisin production in 2021-22. 1 Turkey with 353,167 tons, 2 United States with 332,760 tons, and Iran with 122,595 tons.

Nutrition

Raisins are 15% water, 79% carbohydrates (including 4% fiber), 3% protein, and contain negligible fat (table). In a 100 gram reference amount, raisins supply 299 kilocalories and moderate amounts (10–19% DV) of the Daily Value for several dietary minerals, riboflavin, and vitamin B6 (table).

Toxicity in animals

Raisins can cause kidney failure in both cats and dogs. The cause of this is not known.

Gallery

See also 

 Dried fruit
 Raisin cake
 Snap-dragon, a Victorian parlour game that involved raisins being plucked from a bowl of burning brandy.
 Sun-Maid, a popular brand of raisins available in North America and the United Kingdom.
 The California Raisins, a fictional music group of anthropomorphized raisins created by CalRAB to promote the food on TV
 The chocolate-covered raisin, a candy made by coating the dried fruit in chocolate.
 Oatmeal raisin cookie

References 

 
Berries